South Carolina Highway 375 (SC 375) is a  state highway in the U.S. state of South Carolina. The highway connects rural areas of Williamsburg County with Greeleyville.

Route description
SC 375 begins at an intersection with the southern terminus of SC 377 (Martin Luther King Jr. Avenue) south-southwest of Lane, Williamsburg County, where the roadway continues as Santee Road. It travels to the northwest and immediately crosses some railroad tracks. Then, it intersects U.S. Route 52 (US 52; South Williamsburg County Highway). It curves to the north-northwest and passes Mt. Hope Cemetery. Then, the highway enters Greeleyville, where it passes Greeleyville Elementary School. It then meets its northern terminus, an intersection with US 521 (Society Street).

History

Major intersections

See also

References

External links

 
 Mapmikey's South Carolina Highways Page: SC 375

375
Transportation in Williamsburg County, South Carolina